Quan Hóa district is a district of Thanh Hóa province in the North Central Coast region of Vietnam.

As of 2019 the district had a population of 53,070. The district covers an area of 996 km2. The district capital lies at Quan Hóa.

Trung Sơn commune is the site of the Trung Sơn Hydropower Project.

References

Districts of Thanh Hóa province